Pacific Opera Victoria is located in Victoria, British Columbia, Canada. It performs three full productions per season at Victoria's Royal Theatre accompanied by members of the Victoria Symphony. In their 2009/2010 season, Pacific Opera Victoria expanded to four productions per season and added Saturday matinees.

Founded in 1980, Pacific Opera Victoria (POV) performs a variety of repertoire ranging from standard canon to new pieces. Timothy Vernon is POV's founding artistic director.

Pacific Opera Victoria is notable for constructing its own sets and costumes and retaining its own set construction facilities. It is responsible for several Canadian premieres, including Marc Blitzstein's Regina in 2008, Richard Strauss's Daphne in 2007 and Capriccio in 2010, Lee Hoiby's The Tempest in 2004, and Vittorio Giannini's Taming of the Shrew in 2001.

In February 2000, Pacific Opera staged the world-premiere of Erewhon, the company's first fully produced mainstage commissioned Canadian work. In 2011, Pacific Opera commissioned Mary's Wedding, composed by Andrew P. MacDonald with libretto by Stephen Massicotte based on Massicotte's play of the same name.

References

External links
Pacific Opera Victoria's Website

Canadian opera companies
Culture of Victoria, British Columbia
Tourist attractions in Victoria, British Columbia
Musical groups established in 1980